The 2014–2015 Chinese Short Track Speed Skating League is a multi race national tournament over a season for Short track speed skating. The season began on 25 September 2014 and will end on 22 March 2015. It is organized by the Chinese Skating Association.

Calendar & Results

Men

1. Qitaihe, September 25 to 28, 2014  (National Team Selection)

2. Shenyang, November 6 to 9, 2014

3. Shenyang, November 13 to 16, 2014

4. Harbin, December 18 to 21, 2014

National Championships Harbin, December 26 to 28, 2014

5. Changchun, February 5 to 8, 2015

6. Changchun, February 12 to 15, 2015

Junior Championships Changchun, January 23 to 25, 2015

National Championships Changchun, March 20 to 22, 2015

Women

1. Qitaihe, September 25 to 28, 2014  (National Team Selection)

2. Shenyang, November 6 to 9, 2014

3. Shenyang, November 13 to 16, 2014

4. Harbin, December 18 to 21, 2014

National Championships Harbin, December 26 to 28, 2014

5. Changchun, February 5 to 8, 2015

6. Changchun, February 12 to 15, 2015

Junior Championships Changchun, January 23 to 25, 2015

National Championships Changchun, March 20 to 22, 2015

References

Short track speed skating competitions
Speed skating in China
2014 in Chinese sport
2015 in Chinese sport
2014 in short track speed skating
2015 in short track speed skating